The Type UC I coastal submarines were a class of small minelaying U-boats built in Germany during the early part of World War I. They were the first operational minelaying submarines in the world (although the Russian submarine Krab was laid down earlier). A total of fifteen boats were built. The class is sometimes also referred to as the UC-1 class after , the class leader. The Italian X-class submarine was a reverse-engineered and modified type of the UC-1-class.

Design 
These submarines were designed by Dr. Werner of the Torpedo Inspectorate, and based on the Type UB I small coastal submarines, with a revised bow section housing inclined minelaying tubes and uprated engines to compensate for the increased displacement and less streamlined form. The boats' sole armament was six internal mine tubes with 12 mines, although UC-11 was fitted with a single external torpedo tube in 1916. They were constructed very quickly, and suffered from problems with their minelaying system, which in some cases caused the mines to become armed before exiting their tubes and explode prematurely.

Type UC I submarines had a displacement of  when at the surface and  while submerged. The submarines were powered by one Daimler-Motoren-Gesellschaft or Benz six-cylinder, four-stroke diesel engine producing , an electric motor producing , and one propeller shaft.

They were fitted with six  mine tubes, twelve UC 120 mines, and one  machine gun. They were built by AG Vulcan Stettin or AG Weser Bremen and their complement was fourteen crew members.

List of Type UC I submarines 
A total of 15 Type UC I submarines were built.

 , struck mine off Nieuport, 19 July 1917
 , rammed and sunk by coaster Cottingham off Great Yarmouth, 2 July 1915
 , struck mine off Zeebrugge, 27 May 1916
 , destroyed at Zeebrugge, 5 October 1918
 , wrecked in Thames Estuary 27 April 1916
 , sunk by British seaplanes, Thames Estuary, 27 September 1917
 , departed Zeebrugge, 3 July 1916, and did not return. Believed to have struck a mine
 , grounded on Dutch coast, 14 November 1915. Interned by Netherlands and served in Dutch Navy as the HLNMS M-1 until broken up in 1932
 , sunk by detonation of its own mines, North Sea, 21 October 1915
 , sunk by British submarine E54 21 August 1916, off Dutch coast
 , struck mine in English Channel, 16 June 1918
 , sunk by detonation of its own mines, 16 March 1916 near Taranto; salvaged and repaired by Italy as X1 (scrapped 1919)
 , ran aground and scuttled, Turkish coast, 29 November 1915
 , struck mine off Zeebrugge, 3 October 1917
 , failed to return from Black Sea patrol, November 1916

References

Citations

Bibliography

 
 

Submarine classes
German Type UC I submarines
World War I submarines of Germany
World War I minelayers of Germany